Randa Kassis is a Franco-Syrian politician and a leading secular figure of the Syrian opposition. She is the President of The Astana Platform of the Syrian opposition and the founder of the Movement of the Pluralistic Society.

Biography
She was a member of the Syrian National Council until August 2012. Randa Kassis is the former president of the Coalition of Secular and Democratic Syrians and member of the Syrian National Council. The Coalition of Secular and Democratic Syrians, the nucleus of a secular and democratic Syrian opposition, was created by the union of a dozen Muslim, Christian, Arab and Kurdish parties, who called upon minorities in Syria to support the fight against the government of Bashar al-Assad. Kassis believes in the power of minorities and their role in society, especially in Kurds and highlighted in 2013 the importance of involving Kurds in any political process in Syria.

Kassis is no longer a member of the Syrian National Council, having been excluded due to her many declarations alerting the Syrian opposition about the rise of Muslim fundamentalists.

Kassis is also an anthropologist and journalist. She has also published a book called "Crypts of The Gods", which is a book on religions, their origins, and their ways of functioning. Since the beginning of the Syrian Civil War on March 15, 2011, she has become a leading commentator on the Syrian Conflict and the wider complexities of the Arab Spring and the future of the Middle East region. 

Randa Kassis initiated the Astana platform in 2015 after her request to the President of Kazakhstan to form a platform that could assemble moderate Syrian opponents. The first round of the Astana platform was moderated by Kazakh Ambassador Baghdad Amreyev and the opening session was chaired by the Kazakh  Minister of Foreign Affairs Erland Idrissov. The second round was moderated by Fabien Baussart, President of the Center of Political and Foreign Affairs (CPFA).

Randa Kassis participated in the 2016 Geneva Peace Talks under the banner of the Moscow/Astana groups. She is Co-President with Qadri Jamil of the Syrian secular and democratic opposition delegation. She is criticized by other opposition members for her advocacy to a political transition in cooperation with Bashar al-Assad's regime and her support of the Russian intervention in the civil war.

In 2017, Kassis invited many members of the Syrian opposition, academics and constitutionalists with the help of French constitutionalist expert Xavier Latour, former Minister of Foreign Affairs of Turkey Yasar Yakis and former Minister of Foreign Affairs of Italy Giulio Terzi, in order to start drafting a new constitution for Syria.

On 30 January 2018 Randa Kassis, along with other members of the Astana platform, participated in the Syrian National Congress as President of the Astana platform. Kassis emphasized the importance of creating a constitutional committee in order to facilitate the peace process in Syria, which the UN and Astana troika – Russian, Iran and Turkey – later agreed to create.

October 2018, Kassis worked to include many political factions of the opposition to reach a road map to peace. The document was drawn up by representatives of the opposition invited to Rome by Sant'Egidio, an organisation closed to the Vatican.

Bibliography
Crypts of the Gods, Randa Kassis, Editions E- Kutub, 2013 (EN)
Le Chaos Syrien, printemps arabes et minorités face à l'islamisme, Randa Kassis and Alexandre del Valle, Editions Dhow, 2014 (FR)
Comprendre le chaos syrien, des révolutions arabes au jihad mondial, L'Artilleur, coll. Toucan essais, 2016 (FR)
La Syrie et le Retour de la Russie, Editions des Syrtes, 2018 (FR)

See also
 Syrian Civil War
 Secularism in Syria
 Joumana Haddad

References

External links 
 Official Site

21st-century Syrian politicians
Living people
People of the Syrian civil war
1970 births
21st-century Syrian women politicians
Syrian secularists